Botswana is typically one of Africa's weaker footballing sides, and their performance in the Africa Cup of Nations mostly limited in the qualification round. Botswana had remained in shadow of many African countries in the stronger COSAFA region. However, Botswana did manage some impressive performance in the qualification of 2012 Africa Cup of Nations to finally qualify for their first, and still, their only AFCON up to date. Botswana has not qualified for any AFCON since 2012.

Records

AFCON history and squads

2012 Africa Cup of Nations

Ghana vs. Botswana

Botswana vs. Guinea

Botswana vs. Mali

References

External links
Africa Cup of Nations – Archives competitions – cafonline.com

Botswana national football team
Countries at the Africa Cup of Nations